Fall River Pass (elevation ) is a mountain pass in  northern Colorado, in the Rocky Mountains of the western United States. It is located in the Front Range, within Rocky Mountain National Park. The pass is traversed by U.S. Highway 34 on Trail Ridge Road between Granby and Estes Park. However, as at Milner Pass on the Continental Divide, the road does not descend after reaching the pass from the west, but instead continues to climb along a side ridge; thus, neither pass is the high point on Trail Ridge Road, which crests at  elevation, east of Fall River Pass, still within Rocky Mountain National Park. On the other hand, the old, largely unpaved, and one-way-uphill Fall River Road (see adjoining map) does have its summit at Fall River Pass, where it joins the modern highway for the descent to the west.

The Alpine Visitor Center, one of five visitor centers for Rocky Mountain National Park, is located at Fall River Pass. The highway has a moderately steep 6% grade on either side of this point.

Picture gallery

External links
USGS TopoZone listing
Official Site

Landforms of Larimer County, Colorado
Mountain passes of Colorado
Rocky Mountain National Park
Transportation in Larimer County, Colorado